Sydney "Syd" Hynes (born ) is an English former professional rugby league footballer who played in the 1960s and 1970s, and coached rugby league in the 1970s and 1980s.

Background
Syd Hynes' birth was registered in Hunslet, West Riding of Yorkshire, as of December 2016 Syd Hynes lives in Willagee, Western Australia..

Playing career

International honours
Syd Hynes won caps for England while at Leeds in 1969 against Wales and France, in 1970 against Wales, and France, and won caps for Great Britain while at Leeds in 1970 against Australia (2 matches), New Zealand (2 matches), New Zealand (sub), in the 1970 Rugby League World Cup against Australia, France, New Zealand and Australia, in 1971 against France, and in 1973 against Australia (3 matches).

Challenge Cup Final appearances
Syd Hynes played right-, i.e. number 3, in Leeds' 11–10 victory over Wakefield Trinity in the 1968 Challenge Cup "Watersplash" Final during the 1967–68 season at Wembley Stadium, London on Saturday 11 May 1968, in front of a crowd of 87,100, played right-, i.e. number 3, and was captain in the 7–24 defeat by Leigh in the 1971 Challenge Cup Final during the 1970–71 at Wembley Stadium, London on Saturday 15 May 1971, in front of a crowd of 85,514, and became the first player to be sent-off in a Challenge Cup Final after a headbutt on Leigh's Alex Murphy, and played right-, i.e. number 3, (replaced by interchange/substitute John Langley) in the 13–16 defeat by St. Helens in the 1972 Challenge Cup Final during the 1971–72 season at Wembley Stadium, London on Saturday 13 May 1972, in front of a crowd of 89,495.

County Cup Final appearances
Syd Hynes played right-, i.e. number 3, in Leeds' 22-11 victory over Castleford in the 1968 Yorkshire County Cup Final during the 1968–69 season at Belle Vue, Wakefield on Saturday 19 October 1968, played right-, i.e. number 3, scored 4-goals, and was man of the match winning the White Rose Trophy in the 23-7 victory over Featherstone Rovers in the 1970 Yorkshire County Cup Final during the 1970–71 season at Odsal Stadium, Bradford on Saturday 21 November 1970, played right-, i.e. number 3, and scored a goal in the 36-9 victory over Dewsbury in the 1972 Yorkshire County Cup Final during the 1972–73 season at Odsal Stadium, Bradford on Saturday 7 October 1972, played right-, i.e. number 3, and scored a goal in the 7-2 victory over Wakefield Trinity in the 1973 Yorkshire County Cup Final during the 1973–74 season at Headingley Rugby Stadium, Leeds on Saturday 20 October 1973, played , and was the coach in the 15-11 victory over Hull Kingston Rovers in the 1975 Yorkshire County Cup Final during the 1975–76 season at Headingley Rugby Stadium, Leeds on Saturday 15 November 1975, played right-, i.e. number 3, and was the coach in the 16-12 victory over Featherstone Rovers in the 1976 Yorkshire County Cup Final during the 1976–77 season at Headingley Rugby Stadium, Leeds on Saturday 16 October 1976,

BBC2 Floodlit Trophy Final appearances
Syd Hynes played right-, i.e. number 3, and scored a try, and a goal in Leeds' 9-5 victory over St. Helens in the 1970 BBC2 Floodlit Trophy Final during the 1970–71 season at Headingley Rugby Stadium, Leeds on Tuesday 15 December 1970.

Player's No.6 Trophy Final appearances
Syd Hynes played right-, i.e. number 3, in Leeds' 12-7 victory over Salford in the 1972–73 Player's No.6 Trophy Final during the 1972–73 season at Fartown Ground, Huddersfield on Saturday 24 March 1973.

Testimonial match
Syd Hynes' Testimonial match at Leeds took place in 1974.

Coaching career

Challenge Cup Final appearances
Syd Hynes was the coach in Leeds' 16-7 victory over Widnes in the 1977 Challenge Cup Final during the 1976–77 season at Wembley Stadium, London on Saturday 7 May 1977, in front of a crowd of 80,871, and was the coach in the 14-12 victory over St. Helens in the 1978 Challenge Cup Final during the 1977–78 season at Wembley Stadium, London on Saturday 13 May 1978, in front of a crowd of 96,000.

County Cup Final appearances
Syd Hynes was the coach in Leeds' 15-6 victory over Hull Kingston Rovers in the 1979 Yorkshire County Cup Final during the 1979–80 season at Headingley Rugby Stadium, Leeds on Saturday 27 October 1979.

References

External links
Photograph "Paul Litton - Paul Litten dashes between two Leeds defenders at Odsal Stadium - 13/12/1969" at rlhp.co.uk
Photograph "Syd Hynes Looks For A Pass - Leeds' Syd Hynes looks to send Alan Smith away as Peter Small covers for Bradford. - 22/10/1972" at rlhp.co.uk
Rugby Cup Final 1968 at britishpathe.com

Living people
England national rugby league team players
English rugby league coaches
English rugby league players
English rugby union players
Great Britain national rugby league team players
Leeds Rhinos captains
Leeds Rhinos coaches
Leeds Rhinos players
People from Hunslet
Rugby league centres
Rugby league players from Leeds
Rugby union players from Leeds
Year of birth missing (living people)